In mathematics, singular integral operators on closed curves arise in problems in analysis, in particular complex analysis and harmonic analysis. The two main singular integral operators, the Hilbert transform and the Cauchy transform, can be defined for any smooth Jordan curve in the complex plane and are related by a simple algebraic formula. In the special case of Fourier series for the unit circle, the operators become the classical Cauchy transform, the orthogonal projection onto Hardy space, and the Hilbert transform a real orthogonal linear complex structure. In general the Cauchy transform is a non-self-adjoint idempotent and the Hilbert transform a non-orthogonal complex structure. The range of the Cauchy transform is the Hardy space of the bounded region enclosed by the Jordan curve. The theory for the original curve can be deduced from that of the unit circle, where, because of rotational symmetry, both operators are classical singular integral operators of convolution type. The Hilbert transform satisfies the jump relations of Plemelj and Sokhotski, which express the original function as the difference between the boundary values of holomorphic functions on the region and its complement. Singular integral operators have been studied on various classes of functions, including Hőlder spaces, Lp spaces and Sobolev spaces. In the case of L2 spaces—the case treated in detail below—other operators associated with the closed curve, such as the Szegő projection onto Hardy space and the Neumann–Poincaré operator, can be expressed in terms of the Cauchy transform and its adjoint.

Operators on the unit circle

If f is in L2(T), then it has a Fourier series expansion

Hardy space H2(T) consists of the functions for which the negative coefficients vanish, an = 0 for n < 0. These are precisely the square-integrable functions that arise as boundary values of holomorphic functions in the unit disk |z| < 1. Indeed, f is the boundary value of the function

in the sense that the functions

defined by the restriction of F to the concentric circles |z| = r, satisfy

The orthogonal projection P of L2(T) onto H2(T) is called the Szegő projection. It is a bounded operator on L2(T) with operator norm 1.

By Cauchy's theorem

Thus

When r equals 1, the integrand on the right hand side has a singularity at θ = 0. The truncated Hilbert transform is defined by

where δ = |1 – eiε|. Since it is defined as convolution with a bounded function, it is a bounded operator on L2(T). Now

If f is a polynomial in z then

By Cauchy's theorem the right hand side tends to 0 uniformly as ε, and hence δ, tends to 0. So

uniformly for polynomials. On the other hand, if u(z) = z it is immediate that

Thus if f is a polynomial in z−1 without constant term

 uniformly.

Define the Hilbert transform on the circle by

Thus if f is a trigonometric polynomial

 uniformly.

It follows that if f is any L2 function

 in the L2 norm.

This is a consequence of the result for trigonometric polynomials since the Hε are uniformly bounded in operator norm: indeed their Fourier coefficients are uniformly bounded.

It also follows that, for  a continuous function f on the circle, Hεf converges uniformly to Hf, so in particular pointwise. The pointwise limit is a Cauchy principal value, written

The Hilbert transform has a natural compatibility with orientation-preserving diffeomorphisms of the circle. Thus if H is a diffeomorphism of the circle with

then the operators

are uniformly bounded and tend in the strong operator topology to H. Moreover, if Vf(z) = f(H(z)), then VHV−1 – H  is an operator with smooth kernel, so a Hilbert–Schmidt operator.

Hardy spaces

The Hardy space on the unit circle can be generalized to any multiply connected bounded domain Ω with smooth boundary ∂Ω. The Hardy space H2(∂Ω) can be defined in a number of equivalent ways. The simplest way to define it is as the closure in L2(∂Ω) of the space of holomorphic functions on Ω which extend continuously to smooth functions on the closure of Ω. As Walsh proved, in a result that was a precursor of Mergelyan's theorem, any holomorphic function on Ω that extends continuously to the closure can be approximated in the uniform norm by a rational function with poles in the complementary region Ωc. If Ω is simply connected, then the rational function can be taken to be a polynomial. There is a counterpart of this theorem on the boundary, the Hartogs–Rosenthal theorem, which states that any continuous function ∂Ω can be approximated in the uniform norm by rational functions with poles in the complement of ∂Ω. It follows that for a simply connected domain when ∂Ω is a simple closed curve, H2(∂Ω) is just the closure of the polynomials; in general it is the closure of the space of rational functions with poles lying off ∂Ω.

On the unit circle an L2 function f with Fourier series expansion

has a unique extension to a harmonic function in the unit disk given by the Poisson integral

In particular

so that the norms increase to the value at r = 1, the norm of f. A similar in the complement of the unit disk where the harmonic extension is given by

In this case the norms increase from the value at R = ∞ to the norm of f, the value at R = 1.

A similar result holds for a harmonic function f on a simply connected region with smooth boundary provided the L2 norms are taken over the level curves in a tubular neighbourhood of the boundary. Using vector notation  v(t) = (x(t), y(t)) to parametrize the boundary curve by arc length, the following classical formulas hold:

Thus the unit tangent vector t(t) at t and oriented normal vector  n(t) are given by

The constant relating the acceleration vector to the normal vector is the curvature of the curve:

There are two further formulas of Frenet:

A tubular neighbourhood of the boundary is given by

so that the level curves ∂Ωs with s constant bound domains Ωs. Moreover

Hence differentiating the integral means with respect to s, the derivative in the direction of the inward pointing normal, gives

using Green's theorem. Thus for s small

for some constant M independent of f. This implies that

so that, on integrating this inequality, the norms are bounded near the boundary:

This inequality shows that a function in the L2 Hardy space H2(Ω) leads, via the Cauchy integral operator C, to a holomorphic function on Ω satisfying the classical condition that the integral means

are bounded. Furthermore, the restrictions fs of f to ∂Ωs, which can be naturally identified with ∂Ω, tend in L2 to the original function in Hardy space. In fact H2(Ω) has been defined as the closure in L2(Ω) of rational functions (which can be taken to be polynomials if Ω is simply connected). Any rational function with poles  only in Ωc can be recovered inside Ω from its boundary value g by Cauchy's integral formula

The estimates above show that the functions Cg|∂Ωs depend continuously on Cg|∂Ω. Moreover, in this case the functions tend uniformly to the boundary value and hence also in L2, using the natural identification of the spaces L2(∂Ωs) with   L2(∂Ω). Since Ch can be defined for any L2 function as a holomorphic function on Ω since h is integrable on ∂Ω. Since h is a limit in L2 of rational functions g, the same results hold for h and Ch, with the same inequalities for the integral means. Equally well h is the limit in L2(∂Ω) of the functions Ch|∂Ωs.

The estimates above for the integral means near the boundary show that Cf lies in L2(Ω) and that its L2 norm can be bounded in terms of that of f. Since Cf is also holomorphic, it lies in the Bergman space A2(Ω) of Ω. Thus the Cauchy integral operator C defines a natural mapping from the Hardy space of the boundary into the Bergman space of the interior.

The Hardy space H2(Ω) has a natural partner, namely the closure in L2(∂Ω) of boundary values of rational functions vanishing at ∞ with poles only in Ω. Denoting this subspace by H2+(∂Ω) to distinguish it from the original Hardy space, which will also denoted by H2−(∂Ω), the same reasoning as above can be applied. When applied to a function h in H2+(∂Ω), the Cauchy integral operator defines a holomorphic function F in Ωc vanishing at ∞ such that near the boundary the restriction of F to the level curves, each identified with the boundary, tend in L2 to h. Unlike the case of the circle, H2−(∂Ω) and H2+(∂Ω) are not orthogonal spaces. By the Hartogs−Rosenthal theorem, their sum is dense in L2(∂Ω). As shown below, these are the ±i eigenspaces of the Hilbert transform on ∂Ω, so their sum is in fact direct and the whole of L2(∂Ω).

Hilbert transform on a closed curve
For a bounded simply connected domain Ω in the complex plane with smooth boundary ∂Ω, the theory of the Hilbert transform can be deduced by direct comparison with the Hilbert transform for the unit circle.

To define the Hilbert transform H∂Ω on L2(∂Ω), take ∂Ω to be parametrized by arclength and thus a function z(t). The Hilbert transform is defined to be the limit in the strong operator topology of the truncated operators H∂Ωε defined by

To make the comparison it will be convenient to apply a scaling transformation in C so that the length of ∂Ω
is 2π. (This only changes the operators above by a fixed positive factor.) There is then a canonical unitary isomorphism of L2(∂Ω) onto L2(T), so the two spaces can be identified. The truncated operators H∂Ωε  can be compared  directly with the truncated Hilbert transform
Hε:

where

The kernel K is thus smooth on T × T, so the difference above tends in the strong topology to the Hilbert–Schmidt operator defined by the kernel. It follows that the truncated operators H∂Ωε are uniformly bounded in norm and have a limit in the strong operator topology denoted H∂Ω and called the Hilbert transform on ∂Ω.

Letting ε tend to 0 above yields

Since H is skew-adjoint and H∂Ω differs from H by a Hilbert–Schmidt operator with smooth kernel, it follows that H∂Ω + H∂Ω* is a Hilbert-Schmidt operator with smooth kernel. The kernel can also be computed explicitly using the truncated Hilbert transforms for ∂Ω:

and it can be verified directly that this is a smooth function on T × T.

Plemelj–Sokhotski relation

Let C− and C+ be the Cauchy integral operators for Ω and Ωc. Then

Since the operators C−, C+ and H are bounded, it suffices to check this on rational functions F with poles off ∂Ω and vanishing at ∞ by the Hartogs–Rosenthal theorem. The rational function can be written as a sum of functions F = F− + F+ where F− has poles only in   Ωc and F+ has poles only in Let f, f± be the restrictions of f, f± to ∂Ω. By Cauchy's integral formula

On the other hand, it is straightforward to check that

Indeed, by Cauchy's theorem, since F− is holomorphic in  Ω,

As ε tends to 0, the latter integral tends to πi f−(w) by the residue calculus. A similar argument applies to f+, taking the circular contour on the right inside Ωc.

By continuity it follows that H acts as multiplication by i on H2− and as multiplication by −i on H2+. Since these spaces are closed and their sum dense, it follows that

Moreover,  H2− and H2+ must be the ±i eigenspaces of H, so their sum is the whole of L2(∂Ω). The Plemelj–Sokhotski relation for f in  L2(∂Ω) is the relation

It has been verified for f in the Hardy spaces H2±(∂Ω), so is true also for their sum. The Cauchy idempotent E is defined by

The range of E is thus  H2−(∂Ω) and that of I − E is H2+(∂Ω). From the above

Operators on a closed curve

Two other operators defined on a closed curve ∂Ω can be expressed in terms of the Hilbert and Cauchy transforms H and E.

The Szegő projection P is defined to be the orthogonal projection onto Hardy space H2(∂Ω). Since E is an idempotent with range H2(∂Ω), P is given by the Kerzman–Stein formula:

Indeed, since E − E* is skew-adjoint its spectrum is purely imaginary, so the operator I + E − E* is invertible. It is immediate that

Hence PE* = P. So

Since the operator H + H* is a Hilbert–Schmidt operator wirh smooth kernel, the same is true for E − E*.

Moreover, if J is the conjugate-linear operator of complex conjugation and U the operator of multiplication by the unit tangent vector:

then the formula for the truncated Hilbert transform on ∂Ω immediately yields the following identity for adjoints

Letting ε tend to 0, it follows that

and hence

The comparison with the Hilbert transform for the circle shows that commutators of H and E with diffeomorphisms of the circle are Hilbert–Schmidt operators. Similar their commutators with the multiplication operator corresponding to a smooth function f on the circle is also Hilbert–Schmidt operators. Up to a constant the kernel of the commutator with H is given by the smooth function

The Neumann–Poincaré operator T is defined on real functions f as

Writing h = f + ig,

so that

a Hilbert–Schmidt operator.

Classical definition of Hardy space
The classical definition of Hardy space is as the space of holomorphic functions F on Ω for which the functions Fs = F|∂Ωs have bounded norm in L2(∂Ω). An argument based on the Carathéodory kernel theorem shows that this condition is satisfied whenever there is a family of Jordan curves in Ω, eventually containing any compact subset in their interior, on which the integral means of F are bounded.

To prove that the classical definition of Hardy space gives the space H2(∂Ω), take F as above. Some subsequence hn = Fsn converges weakly in L2(∂Ω) to h say. It follows that Ch = F in Ω. In fact, if Cn is the Cauchy integral operator corresponding to Ωsn, then

Since the first term on the right hand side is defined by pairing h − hn with a fixed L2 function, it tends to zero. If zn(t) is the complex number corresponding to vsn, then

This integral tends to zero because the L2 norms of hn are uniformly bounded while the bracketed expression in the integrand tends to 0 uniformly and hence in L2.

Thus F = Ch. On the other hand, if E is the Cauchy idempotent with range H2(∂Ω), then C ∘ E = C. Hence F =Ch = C (Eh). As already shown Fs tends to Ch in L2(∂Ω). But a subsequence tends weakly to h. Hence Ch = h and therefore the two definitions are equivalent.

Generalizations
The theory for multiply connected bounded domains with smooth boundary follows easily from the simply connected case. There are analogues of the operators H, E and P. On a given component of the boundary, the singular contributions to H and E come from the singular integral on that boundary component, so the technical parts of the theory are direct consequences of the simply connected case.

Notes

References

 

 

Operator theory
Harmonic analysis
Complex analysis